Eric Jelen and Carl-Uwe Steeb were the defending champions, but Jelen chose not to participate, and only Steeb competed that year.
Steeb partnered with Markus Zoecke, but lost in the first round to Murphy Jensen and Gabriel Markus.

Francisco Montana and Greg Van Emburgh won in the final 6–4, 6–2, against Gianluca Pozzi and Olli Rahnasto.

Seeds

  Francisco Montana /  Greg Van Emburgh (champions)
  Martin Damm /  Cyril Suk (semifinals)
  Charles Beckman /  Broderick Dyke (first round)
  Jaime Oncins /  Jan Siemerink (semifinals)

Draw

Draw

External links
Draw

Doubles